The Virgin Komi Forests is a natural UNESCO  World Heritage Site in the Northern Ural Mountains of the Komi Republic, Russia. At 32,800 km² it is the largest virgin forest in Europe.

Geography
The Virgin Komi Forests belong to the Ural Mountains taiga ecoregion. Dominant tree species include Siberian Spruce, Siberian Fir and Siberian Larch, while the most prominent mammals are the reindeer, the sable, the mink and the hare.

The site corresponds to Russia's Pechora-Ilych Nature Reserve and Yugyd Va National Park. Its World Heritage Site status was recognised in 1995, making it the first natural World Heritage Site in the country. This  recognition brought the site additional funding from abroad and saved it from imminent logging by a French company (HUET Holding). However, conservation threats remain, illegal logging and gold-mining in particular. Deposits of gold in the northern part of the Yugyd-Va National Park were to be mined prior to 1995.

Threats
Despite the area's recognition as a World Heritage site, attempts at extracting gold are being actively lobbied by the Head of the Republic and Komi's Ministry of Nature.

Gallery

External links
 Virgin Komi Forests (at the UNESCO World Heritage Site)
 UNEP-WCMC World Heritage - Virgin Komi Forests
Virgin Komi Forests at Natural Heritage Protection Fund

Geography of the Komi Republic
Ural Mountains
Forests of Russia
Old-growth forests
Tourist attractions in the Komi Republic
World Heritage Sites in Russia